Globosides are a sub-class of the lipid class glycosphingolipid with three to nine sugar molecules as the side chain (or R group) of ceramide. The sugars are usually a combination of N-acetylgalactosamine, D-glucose or D-galactose. One characteristic of globosides is that the "core" sugars consists of Glucose-Galactose-Galactose (Ceramide-βGlc4-1βGal4-1αGal), like in the case of the most basic globoside Gb3, also known as pk-antigen. Another important characteristic of globosides is that they are neutral at pH 7, because they usually do not contain neuraminic acid, a sugar with an acidic carboxy-group. However, some globosides with the core structure Cer-Glc-Gal-Gal do contain neuraminic acid, e.g. the globo-series glycosphingolipid "SSEA-4-antigen"

The side chain can be cleaved by galactosidases and glucosidases. The deficiency of α-galactosidase A causes Fabry's disease, an inherited metabolic disease characterized by the accumulation of the globoside globotriaosylceramide.

Globoside (GB4) has been known as the receptor for Parvovirus B19, due to observations that B19V binds to the thin-layered chromatogram of the structure.  However, the binding on its surface does not match well with the virus, which raised debates on whether or not GB4 is the cause for productive infection. Additional research using the technique Knockout Cell Line has shown that although GB4 does not have the direct entry receptor for B19V, it plays a post-entry role in productive infection.

References

External links

Glycolipids
Blood antigen systems
Transfusion medicine